Dentistyla dentifera is a species of sea snail, a marine gastropod mollusk in the family Chilodontidae.

Description
The size of the shell varies between 4 mm and 8 mm. The sculpture, compared to Dentistyla asperrima, is more strongly and exclusively nodulous. A strong blunt tooth is prominent on the columella just within the aperture and above the base of the shell. The outer lip is lirate within.

Distribution
This species occurs in the Gulf of Mexico, off Barbados and in the Atlantic Ocean off North Carolina.

References

 Rosenberg, G., F. Moretzsohn, and E. F. García. 2009. Gastropoda (Mollusca) of the Gulf of Mexico, Pp. 579–699 in Felder, D.L. and D.K. Camp (eds.), Gulf of Mexico–Origins, Waters, and Biota. Biodiversity. Texas A&M Press, College Station, Texas.

External links
 

dentifera
Gastropods described in 1889